Hour of Decision is a 1957 British mystery film directed by C. M. Pennington-Richards and starring Jeff Morrow, Hazel Court and Anthony Dawson. It was shot at Walton Studios with location shooting around London. The film's sets were designed by the art director Arthur Lawson.

Plot
The British wife of an American journalist begins receiving letters blackmailing her over a love affair. Suspicion points to her when the blackmailer is found murdered.

Cast
 Jeff Morrow as Joe Saunders
 Hazel Court as Margaret Saunders / Peggy
 Anthony Dawson as Gary Bax
 Mary Laura Wood as Olive Bax
 Alan Gifford as J. Foster Green
 Carl Bernard as Inspector Gower
 Lionel Jeffries as Albert Mayne
 Anthony Snell as Andrew Crest
 Vanda Godsell as Eileen Chadwick
 Robert Sansom as Reece Chadwick
 Garard Green as Tony Pendleton
 Marne Maitland as Club Waiter
 Arthur Lowe as Calligraphy Expert
 Margaret Allworthy as Denise March
 Richard Shaw as Detective Sergeant Dale
 Frank Atkinson as Caretaker
 Michael Balfour as Barman
 Reginald Hearne as Personnel Manager
 Dennis Chinnery as Studio Photographer

References

External links
 

1957 films
British mystery films
British detective films
Films set in London
Films with screenplays by Norman Hudis
Films directed by C. M. Pennington-Richards
Films shot at Nettlefold Studios
1950s English-language films
1950s British films